Spanioceras is an extinct genus of nautiloid cephalopods belonging to the order Oncocerida, which is thought to have given rise to the Nautilida which includes the living Nautilus.

References

 Sepkoski's Online Genus Database (CEPHALOPODA)

Prehistoric nautiloid genera